Emil Landman (born in 1989 in Amsterdam) is a Dutch folk musician, based in Utrecht. He graduated from the Herman Brood Academy.

Landman released his debut EP A Bargain Between Beggars in February 2013. His debut album, Colours and Their Things, was produced by Martijn Groeneveld and released on 3 October 2014 through V2 Records. The album debuted at number 44 on the Dutch Albums Chart.

Discography

Studio albums

Extended plays

Singles

Music videos

References

External links

1989 births
Dutch male guitarists
Dutch male singer-songwriters
Living people
Musicians from Utrecht (city)
21st-century Dutch male singers
21st-century Dutch singers
21st-century guitarists